Clare Oliver (25 August 1981 – 13 September 2007) was an Australian woman whose own health crisis prompted her to become an activist, garnering wide media coverage for her campaign to raise awareness about the risks of using solariums excessively. She had wanted to become a journalist and wrote a story before her death that was published in newspapers all over the country.  Oliver's melanoma was first discovered as part of a health check-up shortly after she had been employed by SBS Television upon completion of a media degree. She went to Melbourne Girls' College and Presentation College Windsor in her high school years.

Clare partially blames her melanoma on solarium use, but admits that excessive tanning at the beach also contributed to her cancer. She believed the government didn't realise the dangers of solariums, and that young people need to be educated about the dangers of solariums before making any decisions regarding their use.

Oliver was diagnosed at the age of 21. She gained publicity on 22 August 2007 by announcing in an open letter that she only had days to live due to melanoma and stating her goal was to reach her 26th birthday. She did, and celebrated at Luna Park in St Kilda, Victoria. Oliver died less than three weeks later, on 13 September at the Caritas Christi Hospice in Kew.

The Australian government has since made previously voluntary code practices mandatory in the use of tanning beds in Australia. In February 2009, the Victorian government introduced new legislation to tighten the control of solariums and  prohibit people aged under 18 from using them, and in January 2015, solarium use was banned entirely in South Australia, Victoria, Queensland and New South Wales.
The ban on commercial solariums in Western Australia came into effect on 1 January 2016.

References

External links
Clare Oliver Melanoma Fund
, 21 August 2007. This was Clare's first public warning on the dangers of solarium use.
ABC Extended Interview with Clare Oliver

1981 births
2007 deaths
Deaths from melanoma
Activists from Melbourne
Deaths from cancer in Victoria (Australia)